Ukush, also sometimes Uu or Bubu (Sumerian: , which can be read u2-kuš3 or u2-u2), was a Sumerian ruler (ensi) of the city-state of Umma (reigned c. 2350 BCE middle chronology). He was the father of the famous Lugal-Zage-Si, who took control of all Sumer.

Ukush is known from the Nippur vase inscription of Lugal-Zage-Si:

Other inscriptions, such as an inscription on a brick with a central hole in the Bible Lands Museum, also mention Lugalzagesi as "son of Ukush" (𒌉 𒌑𒌑, dumu u2-u2). Another dedicatory inscription is also known.

It is thought that he played an important role in making Umma a strong city with a powerful army, which allowed his son to achieve the defeat of neighbouring and traditional rival Lagash and its king Urukagina, and then the conquest of all Sumer.

See also 
History of Sumer

References 

Kings of Umma
24th-century BC Sumerian kings